Cupid Forecloses is a 1919 American silent comedy film starring Bessie Love and Wallace MacDonald. It was directed by David Smith and produced by Vitagraph Studios. It was based on the popular novel Hurrying Fate and Geraldine by Florence Morse Kingsley. The film has been preserved at the British Film Institute and American Film Institute.

Plot 

Geraldine Farleigh (Love), a timid village schoolteacher, supports her family and must pay off her late father's debt to Bruce Cartwright. She falls in love with the man she believes is a lawyer representing Cartwright (MacDonald), who turns out to be Cartwright himself.

Cast

References

External links 

 
 
 

1919 comedy films
1919 films
American black-and-white films
Silent American comedy films
American silent feature films
Films based on American novels
Films directed by David Smith (director)
Surviving American silent films
1910s American films